Zeynep Sibel Algan (born September 25, 1955) is a Turkish female diplomat.

Zeynep Sibel Algan was born in Istanbul, Turkey on September 25, 1955. She is married to Akın Algan, also a diplomat and ambassador. The couple has one child.

Algan's diplomatic missions were in France as consul in Paris and general consul in Strasbourg until June 2012.

Algan was appointed Ambassador of Turkey to Senegal in February 2012. She served in Dakar until November 2014.

In 2016, she was assigned to the Turkish Embassy in the Netherlands as a substitute. Currently, she serves as ambassador in The Hague.

References

Living people
1955 births
Diplomats from Istanbul
Galatasaray High School alumni
Ankara University Faculty of Political Sciences alumni
Turkish women ambassadors
Ambassadors of Turkey to Senegal
Ambassadors of Turkey to the Netherlands
21st-century Turkish diplomats